Minuscule 455 (in the Gregory-Aland numbering), ΟΘ 41 (in the Soden numbering), is a Greek minuscule manuscript of the New Testament, on paper. Palaeographically it has been assigned to the 13th or 14th century. 
Formerly it was labelled by 85a and 95p.

Description 

The codex contains the text of the Acts of the Apostles and Pauline epistles on 285 paper leaves. It is written in one column per page, in 31-45 lines per page. The letters are written above lines. It contains Prolegomena, Synaxarion (liturgical book with hagiographies), and commentaries of Theophylact. 

The order of books: Acts, Romans, Hebrews, Colossians, 1-2 Thessalonians, Titus, 1-2 Corinthians, 1-2 Timothy, Ephesians, Philippians, Galatians, and Philemon.

Kurt Aland the Greek text of the codex did not place in any Category.

History 

The manuscript was examined by Birch, Scholz, and C. R. Gregory (1886). It was slightly collated by Scholz.

Formerly it was labelled by 85a and 95p. In 1908 Gregory gave the number 455 to it.

It is currently housed at the Laurentian Library (Plutei IV. 5) in Florence.

See also 

 List of New Testament minuscules
 Biblical manuscript
 Textual criticism

References

Further reading

External links 
 

Greek New Testament minuscules
13th-century biblical manuscripts